Pterolophia albovariegata is a species of beetle in the family Cerambycidae. It was described by Stephan von Breuning in 1938.

Subspecies
 Pterolophia albovariegata kenyana Breuning, 1961
 Pterolophia albovariegata albovariegata Breuning, 1938

References

albovariegata
Beetles described in 1938